The 1987–88 season saw the Lakers win their eleventh NBA championship, defeating the Detroit Pistons in a hard-fought seven games in the NBA Finals to become the NBA's first repeat champions since the Boston Celtics did it in the 1968–69 NBA season. In doing so, the Lakers made good on Pat Riley's famous promise to repeat as champions. "I'm guaranteeing everybody here," Riley said at the civic celebrations following the Lakers’ 1987 championship win, "next year we’re gonna win it again." Before the Lakers could make good on Riley's guarantee, they swept the San Antonio Spurs in the opening round of the playoffs. The following two rounds however would not be as easy for the Lakers, but they still managed to get through a tough seven-game series against both the Utah Jazz in the Western Conference Semis and the Dallas Mavericks Western Conference Finals.

By the time the Lakers had finished their season they had played an NBA record 106 games including another record 24 playoff games, winning 77 and losing 29. The Lakers went 62–20 in the regular season and 15–9 in the playoffs, en route to their sixth NBA Championship in Los Angeles, and their 11th overall in franchise history.

The 1988 Finals was the last time the Showtime-era Lakers won an NBA championship.  It was also the final time that the franchise won a championship at The Forum. They did not win another league title until 2000, when they were playing at the Staples Center (now the Crypto.com Arena).

Magic Johnson, James Worthy and Kareem Abdul-Jabbar were all selected to play in the 1988 NBA All-Star Game held in Chicago. Pat Riley was chosen to coach the Western Conference All-Stars.

Draft picks

Roster

Regular season

Season standings

z – clinched division title
y – clinched division title
x – clinched playoff spot

Record vs. opponents

Game logs

Regular season

|-style="background:#cfc;"
| 1 || November 6, 19877:30 pm PST || Seattle
| W 113–109
| Johnson (26)
| Green (12)
| Johnson (8)
| The Forum17,505
| 1–0
|-style="background:#cfc;"
| 2 || November 8, 19877:30 pm PST || Houston
| W 101–92
| Johnson & Scott (23)
| Green (18)
| Johnson (12)
| The Forum17,505
| 2–0
|-style="background:#cfc;"
| 3 || November 10, 19875:30 pm PST || @ San Antonio
| W 133–124
| Green (32)
| Green (10)
| Johnson (13)
| HemisFair Arena13,751
| 3–0
|-style="background:#cfc;"
| 4 || November 12, 19877:30 pm PST || L.A. Clippers
| W 111–82
| Worthy (20)
| Abdul-Jabbar & M Thompson (10)
| Johnson (11)
| The Forum15,569
| 4–0
|-style="background:#cfc;"
| 5 || November 14, 19877:30 pm PST || @ Golden State
| W 118–110
| Scott (27)
| M Thompson (9)
| Johnson (12)
| Oakland-Alameda Arena15,025
| 5–0
|-style="background:#cfc;"
| 6 || November 15, 19877:30 pm PST || San Antonio
| W 147–130
| Johnson (25)
| Green (13)
| Johnson & Worthy (10)
| The Forum17,505
| 6–0
|-style="background:#cfc;"
| 7 || November 17, 19877:30 pm PST || Portland
| W 142–115
| M Thompson (24)
| Green & Rambis (10)
| Johnson (14)
| The Forum16,347
| 7–0
|-style="background:#cfc;"
| 8 || November 20, 19877:30 pm PST || Dallas
| W 119–116
| Scott (25)
| Green (11)
| Johnson (15)
| The Forum17,505
| 8–0
|-style="background:#fcc;"
| 9 || November 22, 19877:30 pm PST || Milwaukee
| L 116–124 (OT)
| Johnson (26)
| Green (11)
| Johnson (11)
| The Forum17,505
| 8–1
|-style="background:#fcc;"
| 10 || November 24, 19877:30 pm PST || @ Seattle
| L 85–103
| Johnson (23)
| Green (10)
| Johnson (6)
| Seattle Center Coliseum14,634
| 8–2
|-style="background:#cfc;"
| 11 || November 27, 19877:30 pm PST || Denver
| W 127–119
| Green (28)
| Green (16)
| Johnson (16)
| The Forum17,505
| 9–2

|-style="background:#cfc;"
| 12 || December 1, 19877:30 pm PST || @ Sacramento
| W 125–120 (OT)
| Abdul-Jabbar (27)
| Green (15)
| Johnson (10)
| ARCO Arena10,333
| 10–2
|-style="background:#fcc;"
| 13 || December 2, 19877:30 pm PST || Portland
| L 104–117
| Cooper (17)
| Green (13)
| Johnson & Cooper (9)
| The Forum17,505
| 10–3
|-style="background:#fcc;"
| 14 || December 4, 19875:00 pm PST || @ Milwaukee
| L 83–85
| Johnson (22)
| Johnson (10)
| Johnson (12)
| MECCA Arena11,052
| 10–4
|-style="background:#fcc;"
| 15 || December 5, 19874:30 pm PST || @ Cleveland
| L 95–97
| Abdul-Jabbar, Johnson & Scott (19)
| Green & Johnson (9)
| Johnson (9)
| Richfield Coliseum20,015
| 10–5
|-style="background:#cfc;"
| 16 || December 8, 19874:30 pm PST || @ New Jersey
| W 98–81
| Scott (21)
| Johnson (13)
| Johnson (14)
| Brendan Byrne Arena18,008
| 11–5
|-style="background:#fcc;"
| 17 || December 9, 19874:30 pm PST || @ Washington
| L 112–120 (OT)
| Johnson (30)
| Cooper (12)
| Johnson (14)
| Capital Centre18,643
| 11–6
|-style="background:#cfc;"
| 18 || December 11, 19875:00 pm PST || @ Boston
| W 115–114
| Abdul-Jabbar (23)
| Abdul-Jabbar & Johnson (8)
| Johnson (17)
| Boston Garden14,890
| 12–6
|-style="background:#cfc;"
| 19 || December 13, 19877:30 pm PST || Cleveland
| W 90–89
| Worthy (20)
| Green (11)
| Johnson (8)
| The Forum17,505
| 13–6
|-style="background:#cfc;"
| 20 || December 15, 19877:30 pm PST || Phoenix
| W 122–97
| Scott (31)
| Green (14)
| Johnson & Scott (9)
| The Forum17,371
| 14–6
|-style="background:#cfc;"
| 21 || December 17, 19877:30 pm PST || @ Golden State
| L 113–106
| Johnson (31)
| Green (12)
| Johnson (17)
| Oakland-Alameda Arena15,025
| 15–6
|-style="background:#cfc;"
| 22 || December 19, 19877:30 pm PST || @ L.A. Clippers
| W 108–97
| Johnson (28)
| Green (12)
| Johnson & Cooper (7)
| LA Memorial Sports Arena14,417
| 16–6
|-style="background:#cfc;"
| 23 || December 20, 19877:30 pm PST || Seattle
| W 103–94
| M Thompson (22)
| Green (9)
| Johnson (12)
| The Forum17,505
| 17–6
|-style="background:#cfc;"
| 24 || December 23, 19877:30 pm PST || Sacramento
| W 117–103
| Johnson (26)
| Green & M Thompson (9)
| Cooper (9)
| The Forum17,505
| 18–6
|-style="background:#cfc;"
| 25 || December 26, 19871:00 pm PST || @ Utah
| W 117–109
| Scott (26)
| Abdul-Jabbar (9)
| Johnson (14)
| Salt Palace12,212
| 19–6
|-style="background:#cfc;"
| 26 || December 29, 19877:30 pm PST || Philadelphia
| W 131–115
| Scott (37)
| Rambis (10)
| Johnson (17)
| The Forum17,505
| 20–6

|-style="background:#cfc;"
| 27 || January 3, 19885:00 pm PST || @ Portland
| W 98–81
| Scott (31)
| Green (10)
| Johnson (9)
| Veterans Memorial Coliseum12,666
| 21–6
|-style="background:#cfc;"
| 28 || January 4, 19887:30 pm PST || San Antonio
| W 133–115
| Worthy (23)
| Johnson (8)
| Johnson (13)
| The Forum17,505
| 22–6
|-style="background:#cfc;"
| 29 || January 6, 19887:30 pm PST || Dallas
| W 103–89
| Scott (28)
| Green (9)
| Johnson (15)
| The Forum17,505
| 23–6
|-style="background:#cfc;"
| 30 || January 8, 19885:00 pm PST || @ Detroit
| W 106–104
| Scott (35)
| Worthy (8)
| Johnson (9)
| Pontiac Silverdome40,278
| 24–6
|-style="background:#cfc;"
| 31 || January 9, 19884:30 pm PST || @ Indiana
| W 101–98
| Johnson & Worthy (21)
| Green (12)
| Johnson (13)
| Market Square Arena16,912
| 25–6
|-style="background:#cfc;"
| 32 || January 12, 19887:30 pm PST || Golden State
| W 117–113
| Scott (30)
| Green (11)
| Johnson (14)
| The Forum17,505
| 26–6
|-style="background:#fcc;"
| 33 || January 13, 19887:30 pm PST || @ L.A. Clippers
| L 109–110 (OT)
| Johnson (27)
| Johnson (11)
| Johnson (13)
| LA Memorial Sports Arena14,906
| 26–7
|-style="background:#cfc;"
| 34 || January 16, 19886:30 pm PST || @ Phoenix
| W 107–96
| Worthy (25)
| Green (8)
| Johnson (9)
| Arizona Veterans Memorial Coliseum14,471
| 27–7
|-style="background:#cfc;"
| 35 || January 18, 19882:00 pm PST || Houston
| W 121–110
| Johnson (39)
| Green (9)
| Johnson (17)
| The Forum17,505
| 28–7
|-style="background:#fcc;"
| 36 || January 21, 19886:30 pm PST || @ Denver
| L 113–115
| Worthy (22)
| Green & Johnson (10)
| Johnson (14)
| McNichols Sports Arena17,022
| 28–8
|-style="background:#cfc;"
| 37 || January 22, 19887:30 pm PST || New York
| W 113–112
| Abdul-Jabbar (24)
| Green (9)
| Johnson & Scott (8)
| The Forum17,505
| 29–8
|-style="background:#cfc;"
| 38 || January 24, 198812:30 pm PST || @ Seattle
| W 116–109
| Johnson (34)
| Worthy (12)
| Worthy (7)
| Seattle Center Coliseum14,739
| 30–8
|-style="background:#cfc;"
| 39 || January 26, 19887:30 pm PST || Utah
| W 111–100
| Johnson (22)
| Worthy (10)
| Johnson (11)
| The Forum17,505
| 31–8
|-style="background:#cfc;"
| 40 || January 28, 19887:30 pm PST || @ Sacramento
| W 115–94
| Worthy (26)
| Green (13)
| Johnson (9)
| ARCO Arena10,333
| 32–8
|-style="background:#cfc;"
| 41 || January 29, 19887:30 pm PST || Atlanta
| W 117–107
| Worthy (29)
| Green (8)
| Johnson (13)
| The Forum17,505
| 33–8

|-style="background:#cfc;"
| 42 || February 2, 19887:30 pm PST || Chicago
| W 110–101
| Worthy (25)
| Abdul-Jabbar (8)
| Johnson (11)
| The Forum17,505
| 34–8
|-style="background:#cfc;"
| 43 || February 4, 1988 || @ L.A. Clippers
| W 117–86
| Scott (21)
| Abdul-Jabbar & Johnson (10)
| Johnson (11)
| LA Memorial Sports Arena15,371
| 35–8
|-style="background:#fcc;"
| 44 || February 9, 19887:30 pm PST || Indiana
| L 108–110
| Worthy (30)
| Worthy & Green (8)
| Johnson (11)
| The Forum17,505
| 35–9
|-style="background:#cfc;"
| 45 || February 11, 19886:30 pm PST || @ Denver
| W 120–108
| Johnson (26)
| Green (14)
| Cooper (9)
| McNichols Sports Arena17,022
| 36–9
|-style="background:#cfc;"
| 46 || February 12, 19885:30 pm PST || @ San Antonio
| W 133–132
| Worthy & Scott (23)
| Johnson (9)
| Johnson (13)
| HemisFair Arena15,770
| 37–9
|-style="background:#cfc;"
| 47 || February 14, 198812:30 pm PST || Boston
| W 115–106
| Scott (38)
| Thompson (11)
| Johnson (14)
| The Forum17,505
| 38–9
|-style="background:#cfc;"
| 48 || February 16, 19887:30 pm PST || L.A. Clippers
| W 119–100
| Scott (30)
| M Thompson (9)
| Johnson (12)
| The Forum17,505
| 39–9
|-style="background:#cfc;"
| 49 || February 18, 19885:30 pm PST || @ Houston
| W 111–96
| Scott (27)
| Green (10)
| Johnson (13)
| The Summit16,611
| 40–9
|-style="background:#cfc;"
| 50 || February 19, 19885:00 pm PST || @ Atlanta
| W 126–119 (OT)
| Worthy (38)
| Green (11)
| Johnson (19)
| The Omni16,451
| 41–9
|-style="background:#cfc;"
| 51 || February 21, 198812:30 pm PST || Detroit
| W 117–110
| Worthy (24)
| Scott & M Thompson (8)
| Johnson (13)
| The Forum17,505
| 42–9
|-style="background:#cfc;"
| 52 || February 23, 19887:30 pm PST || Washington
| W 111–100
| Worthy (23)
| M Thompson (9)
| Johnson (12)
| The Forum17,505
| 43–9
|-style="background:#cfc;"
| 53 || February 26, 19887:30 pm PST || Utah
| W 112–105
| Johnson (27)
| Worthy (9)
| Johnson (17)
| The Forum17,505
| 44–9
|-style="background:#cfc;"
| 54 || February 28, 19887:30 pm PST || Phoenix
| W 111–97
| Scott (30)
| M Thompson (7)
| Johnson (15)
| The Forum17,505
| 45–9

|-style="background:#fcc;"
| 55 || March 1, 19887:30 pm PST || @ Seattle
| L 100–114
| Scott (21)
| Green (16)
| Johnson (13)
| Seattle Center Coliseum14,850
| 45–10
|-style="background:#cfc;"
| 56 || March 4, 19887:30 pm PST  || Golden State
| W 120–107
| Scott (30)
| Green (11)
| Johnson (10)
| The Forum17,505
| 46–10
|-style="background:#cfc;"
| 57 || March 6, 198811:00 am PST || @ Dallas
| W 108–97
| Scott (28)
| Green (12)
| Johnson (16)
| Reunion Arena17,007
| 47–10
|-style="background:#cfc;"
| 58 || March 7, 19884:30 pm PST || @ Philadelphia
| W 110–104
| Johnson (24)
| Johnson (11)
| Johnson (17)
| The Spectrum18,168
| 48–10
|-style="background:#cfc;"
| 59 || March 9, 19885:00 pm PST || @ New York
| W 104–99
| Johnson (26)
| Johnson (14)
| Johnson (9)
| Madison Square Garden19,591
| 49–10
|-style="background:#fcc;"
| 60 || March 10, 19885:30 pm PST || @ Chicago
| L 107–128
| Worthy (21)
| Green & M Thompson (12)
| Wagner (6)
| Chicago Stadium18,676
| 49–11
|-style="background:#fcc;"
| 61 || March 12, 19888:00 pm PST || Dallas
| L 101–110
| Scott (35)
| M Thompson (11)
| Scott (10)
| The Forum17,505
| 49–12
|-style="background:#cfc;"
| 62 || March 14, 19887:30 pm PST || New Jersey
| W 115–105
| Scott (21)
| Rambis (6)
| Matthews (11)
| The Forum17,505
| 50–12
|-style="background:#fcc;"
| 63 || March 15, 19887:30 pm PST || @ Portland
| L 95–112
| Worthy (21)
| Green (11)
| Cooper (5)
| Veterans Memorial Coliseum12,666
| 50–13
|-style="background:#fcc;"
| 64 || March 19, 19886:30 pm PST || @ Phoenix
| L 97–102
| M Thompson (21)
| Abdul-Jabbar (12)
| Scott & Matthews (7)
| Arizona Veterans Memorial Coliseum14,471
| 50–14
|-style="background:#cfc;"
| 65 || March 20, 19887:30 pm PST || @ Golden State
| W 130–127
| Scott (29)
| M Thompson (10)
| Matthews (13)
| Oakland-Alameda Arena15,025
| 51–14
|-style="background:#cfc;"
| 66 || March 22, 19887:30 pm PST || Houston
| W 117–95
| Scott (21)
| Green (10)
| Johnson (12)
| The Forum17,505
| 52–14
|-style="background:#fcc;"
| 67 || March 25, 19887:30 pm PST || Denver
| L 119–120
| Worthy (24)
| Green (13)
| Scott (10)
| The Forum17,505
| 52–15
|-style="background:#fcc;"
| 68 || March 26, 19887:30 pm PST || @ Sacramento
| L 92–114
| Scott (26)
| Worthy (9)
| Matthews (5)
| ARCO Arena10,333
| 52–16
|-style="background:#cfc;"
| 69 || March 29, 19887:30 pm PST || Utah
| W 122–111
| Worthy (31)
| Rambis (12)
| Matthews (13)
| The Forum17,505
| 53–16

|-style="background:#fcc;"
| 70 || April 2, 19886:30 pm PST || @ Utah
| L 92–106
| Scott (23)
| M Thompson (10)
| Matthews (7)
| Salt Palace12,444
| 53–17
|-style="background:#cfc;"
| 71 || April 3, 19887:30 pm PDT || Sacramento
| W 108–104
| Worthy (24)
| M Thompson (7)
| Matthews (10)
| The Forum17,505
| 54–17
|-style="background:#cfc;"
| 72 || April 5, 19887:30 pm PDT || Seattle
| W 94–90
| Worthy (28)
| Worthy (8)
| Worthy (4)
| The Forum17,505
| 55–17
|-style="background:#cfc;"
| 73 || April 8, 19887:30 pm PDT || L.A. Clippers
| W 126–107
| Scott & Campbell (20)
| Rambis (15)
| Johnson (9)
| The Forum17,505
| 56–17
|-style="background:#fcc;"
| 74 || April 9, 19887:30 pm PDT || @ Portland
| L 109–119
| Worthy (22)
| Rambis (6)
| Johnson (12)
| Veterans Memorial Coliseum12,666
| 56–18
|-style="background:#cfc;"
| 75 || April 12, 19887:30 pm PDT || Portland
| W 109–103
| Scott & Worthy (25)
| M Thompson (13)
| Johnson (13)
| The Forum17,505
| 57–18
|-style="background:#fcc;"
| 76 || April 13, 19886:30 pm PDT || @ Denver
| L 106–120
| Campbell (16)
| Johnson (11)
| Johnson (10)
| McNichols Sports Arena17,022
| 57–19
|-style="background:#cfc;"
| 77 || April 15, 19887:30 pm PDT || Phoenix
| W 117–114
| Johnson (31)
| M Thompson (9)
| Johnson (15)
| The Forum17,505
| 58–19
|-style="background:#fcc;"
| 78 || April 17, 198810:00 am PDT || @ Houston
| L 119–127
| Scott & M Thompson (22)
| Johnson (10)
| Johnson (12)
| The Summit16,611
| 58–20
|-style="background:#cfc;"
| 79 || April 19, 19885:30 pm PDT || @ San Antonio
| W 133–126
| Worthy (28)
| Green (10)
| Johnson (9)
| HemisFair Arena12,456
| 59–20
|-style="background:#cfc;"
| 80 || April 20, 19885:30 pm PDT || @ Dallas
| W 114–107
| Scott (31)
| M Thompson (11)
| Johnson (23)
| Reunion Arena17,007
| 60–20
|-style="background:#cfc;"
| 81 || April 22, 19887:30 pm PDT || @ Phoenix
| W 117–112
| M Thompson (24)
| Green (11)
| Johnson (17)
| Arizona Veterans Memorial Coliseum14,077
| 61–20
|-style="background:#cfc;"
| 82 || April 24, 198812:30 pm PDT  || Golden State
| W 136–100
| Campbell (28)
| Rambis (11)
| Matthews (10)
| The Forum17,505
| 62–20

Playoffs

|- align="center" bgcolor="#ccffcc"
| 1 || April 29, 19887:30 pm PDT || San Antonio
| W 122–110
| James Worthy (22)
| Mychal Thompson (14)
| Magic Johnson (18)
| The Forum17,505
| 1–0
|- align="center" bgcolor="#ccffcc"
| 2 || May 1, 19887:30 pm PDT || San Antonio
| W 130–112
| Mychal Thompson (29)
| Mychal Thompson (16)
| Magic Johnson (15)
| The Forum17,505
| 2–0
|- align="center" bgcolor="#ccffcc"
| 3 || May 3, 19885:30 pm PDT || @ San Antonio
| W 109–107
| Magic Johnson (25)
| James Worthy (11)
| Magic Johnson (11)
| HemisFair Arena11,542
| 3–0

|- align="center" bgcolor="#ccffcc"
| 1 || May 8, 198812:30 pm PDT || Utah
| W 110–91
| James Worthy (23)
| Kareem Abdul-Jabbar (10)
| Magic Johnson (9)
| The Forum17,505
| 1–0
|- align="center" bgcolor="#ffcccc"
| 2 || May 10, 19888:00 pm PDT || Utah
| L 97–101
| Byron Scott (26)
| Mychal Thompson (12)
| Magic Johnson (10)
| The Forum17,505
| 1–1
|- align="center" bgcolor="#ffcccc"
| 3 || May 13, 19888:00 pm PDT || @ Utah
| L 89–96
| Byron Scott (29)
| Mychal Thompson (12)
| Magic Johnson (6)
| Salt Palace12,444
| 1–2
|- align="center" bgcolor="#ccffcc"
| 4 || May 15, 198812:30 pm PDT || @ Utah
| W 113–100
| James Worthy (29)
| Kareem Abdul-Jabbar (11)
| Magic Johnson (9)
| Salt Palace12,444
| 2–2
|- align="center" bgcolor="#ccffcc"
| 5 || May 17, 19887:30 pm PDT || Utah
| W 111–109
| James Worthy (27)
| Mychal Thompson (11)
| Magic Johnson (13)
| The Forum17,505
| 3–2
|- align="center" bgcolor="#ffcccc"
| 6 || May 19, 19887:30 pm PDT || @ Utah
| L 80–108
| Byron Scott (16)
| Mychal Thompson (9)
| Magic Johnson (9)
| Salt Palace12,444
| 3–3
|- align="center" bgcolor="#ccffcc"
| 7 || May 21, 198812:30 pm PDT || Utah
| W 109–98
| Byron Scott (29)
| Magic Johnson (9)
| Magic Johnson (16)
| The Forum17,505
| 4–3

|- align="center" bgcolor="#ccffcc"
| 1 || May 23, 19887:30 pm PDT || Dallas
| W 113–98
| Worthy (28)
| three players tied (6)
| Johnson (12)
| The Forum17,505
| 1–0
|- align="center" bgcolor="#ccffcc"
| 2 || May 25, 19887:30 pm PDT || Dallas
| W 123–101
| Scott (30)
| Abdul-Jabbar (7)
| Johnson (19)
| The Forum17,505
| 2–0
|- align="center" bgcolor="#ffcccc"
| 3 || May 27, 19885:00 pm PDT || @ Dallas
| L 94–106
| Worthy (19)
| Johnson (8)
| Johnson (10)
| Reunion Arena17,007
| 2–1
|- align="center" bgcolor="#ffcccc"
| 4 || May 29, 198812:30 pm PDT || @ Dallas
| L 104–118
| Johnson (28)
| Green (12)
| Johnson (12)
| Reunion Arena17,007
| 2–2
|- align="center" bgcolor="#ccffcc"
| 5 || May 31, 19888:30 pm PDT || Dallas
| W 119–102
| Worthy (28)
| Green (10)
| Johnson (20)
| The Forum17,505
| 3–2
|- align="center" bgcolor="#ffcccc"
| 6 || June 2, 19886:00 pm PDT || @ Dallas
| L 103–105
| Scott, Worthy (27)
| Worthy (11)
| Johnson (12)
| Reunion Arena17,007
| 3–3
|- align="center" bgcolor="#ccffcc"
| 7 || June 4, 198812:30 pm PDT || Dallas
| W 117–102
| Worthy (28)
| Johnson (9)
| Johnson (11)
| The Forum17,505
| 4–3

|- align="center" bgcolor="#ffcccc"
| 1 || June 7, 19886:00 pm PDT || Detroit
| L 93–105
| Johnson (28)
| Green (12)
| Johnson (10)
| The Forum17,505
| 0–1
|- align="center" bgcolor="#ccffcc"
| 2 || June 9, 19886:00 pm PDT || Detroit
| W 108–96
| Worthy (26)
| Green (13)
| Johnson (11)
| The Forum17,505
| 1–1
|- align="center" bgcolor="#ccffcc"
| 3 || June 12, 198812:30 pm PDT || @ Detroit
| W 99–86
| Worthy (24)
| Worthy (9)
| Johnson (14)
| Pontiac Silverdome39,188
| 2–1
|- align="center" bgcolor="#ffcccc"
| 4 || June 14, 19886:00 pm PDT || @ Detroit
| L 86–111
| Johnson (23)
| Green (10)
| Johnson (6)
| Pontiac Silverdome34,297
| 2–2
|- align="center" bgcolor="#ffcccc"
| 5 || June 16, 19886:00 pm PDT || @ Detroit
| L 94–104
| Abdul-Jabbar (26)
| three players tied (6)
| Johnson (17)
| Pontiac Silverdome41,372
| 2–3
|- align="center" bgcolor="#ccffcc"
| 6 || June 19, 198812:30 pm PDT || Detroit
| W 103–102
| Worthy (28)
| Green (10)
| Johnson (19)
| The Forum17,505
| 3–3
|- align="center" bgcolor="#ccffcc"
| 7 || June 21, 19886:00 pm PDT || Detroit
| W 108–105
| Worthy (36)
| Worthy (16)
| Johnson (14)
| The Forum17,505
| 4–3

Player statistics

Season

|-
| 
| 80 || 80 || 28.9 || .532 || .000 || .762 || 6.0 || 1.7 || 0.6 ||style="background:#ffcd35;color:#6137ad;"| 1.2 || 14.6
|-
| 
| 13 || 1 || 18.6 || .564 || .333 || .718 || 2.1 || 1.1 || 0.8 || 0.2 || 11.0
|-
| 
| 61 || 8 || 19.4 || .392 || .320 || .858 || 3.7 || 4.7 || 1.1 || 0.4 || 8.7
|-
| 
| style="background:#ffcd35;color:#6137ad;"| 82 || 64 || 32.1 || .503 || .000 || .773 ||style="background:#ffcd35;color:#6137ad;"| 8.7 || 1.1 || 1.1 || 0.5 || 11.4
|-
| 
|  72 || 70 || 36.6 || .492 || .196 || .853 || 6.2 ||style="background:#ffcd35;color:#6137ad;"| 11.9 ||style="background:#ffcd35;color:#6137ad;"| 1.6 || 0.2 || 19.6
|-
| 
|  3 || 0 || 2.3 || .000 || .000 ||style="background:#ffcd35;color:#6137ad;"| 1.000 || 0.0 || 0.0 || 0.0 || 0.0 || 0.7
|-
| 
| 51 || 8 || 13.8 || .460 || .233 || .831 || 1.3 || 2.7 || 0.5 || 0.1 || 5.7
|-
| 
| 70 || 20 || 12.1 || .548 || .000 || .785 || 3.8 || 0.8 || 0.6  || 0.2 || 4.0
|-
| 
| 81 ||style="background:#ffcd35;color:#6137ad;"| 81 ||style="background:#ffcd35;color:#6137ad;"| 37.6 || .527 ||style="background:#ffcd35;color:#6137ad;"| .346 || .858 || 4.1 || 4.1 || 1.9 || 0.3 ||style="background:#ffcd35;color:#6137ad;"| 21.7
|-
| 
|  48 || 2 || 8.8 || .427 || .000 || .667 || 1.8 || 0.2 || 0.1 || 0.9 || 2.8
|-
| 
| 9 || 0 || 4.2 || .231 || .000 || .800 || 1.0 || 0.1 || 0.1 || 0.0 || 1.6
|-
| 
| 80 || 0 || 25.1 || .512 || .000 || .634 || 6.1 || 0.8 || 0.5 || 1.0 || 11.6
|-
| 
| 14 || 0 || 5.9 ||style="background:#ffcd35;color:#6137ad;"| .571 || .000 || .769 || 0.7 || 1.5 || 0.2 || 0.2 || 3.0
|-
| 
| 40 || 4 || 9.5 || .422 || .200 || .897 || 0.7 || 1.5 || 0.2 || 0.1 || 3.8
|-
| 
| 75 || 72 || 35.4 || .531 || .125 || .796 || 5.0 || 3.9 || 1.0 || 0.7 || 19.7
|}

Playoffs

|-
| 
| style="background:#ffcd35;color:#6137ad;"| 24 ||style="background:#ffcd35;color:#6137ad;"| 24 || 29.9 || .464 || .000 || .789 || 5.5 || 1.5 || 0.6 ||style="background:#ffcd35;color:#6137ad;"| 1.5 || 14.1
|-
| 
| 15 || 0 || 6.3 || .429 || .000 || .688 || 0.7 || 0.3 || 0.2 || 0.0 || 3.1
|-
| 
| style="background:#ffcd35;color:#6137ad;"| 24 || 0 || 24.5 || .412 || .403 || .741 || 2.4 || 2.7 || 0.8 || 0.3 || 6.4
|-
| 
| style="background:#ffcd35;color:#6137ad;"| 24 || 18  || 30.3 || .544 || .000 || .753 ||style="background:#ffcd35;color:#6137ad;"| 7.3 || 0.8 || 0.1 || 0.5 || 10.1
|-
| 
| style="background:#ffcd35;color:#6137ad;"| 24 ||style="background:#ffcd35;color:#6137ad;"| 24 ||style="background:#ffcd35;color:#6137ad;"| 40.2 || .514 || .500 || .852 || 5.4 ||style="background:#ffcd35;color:#6137ad;"| 12.6 ||style="background:#ffcd35;color:#6137ad;"| 1.4 || 0.1 || 19.9
|-
| 
| 10 || 0 || 2.7 || .400 || .000 || .800 || 0.1 || 0.2 || 0.1 || 0.0 || 1.2
|-
| 
| 19 || 6 || 9.8 ||style="background:#ffcd35;color:#6137ad;"| .618 || .000 || .692 || 2.7 || 0.4 || 0.2  || 0.1 || 2.7
|-
| 
| style="background:#ffcd35;color:#6137ad;"| 24 ||style="background:#ffcd35;color:#6137ad;"| 24 || 37.4 || .499 ||style="background:#ffcd35;color:#6137ad;"| .436 || .865 || 4.2 || 2.5 || 1.4 || 0.2 || 19.6
|-
| 
|  8 || 0 || 4.3 || .200 || .000 || .333 || 0.8 || 0.0 || 0.1 || 0.3 || 0.4
|-
| 
| style="background:#ffcd35;color:#6137ad;"| 24 || 0 || 25.6 || .513 || .000 || .581 || 7.1 || 0.5 || 0.7 || 0.8 || 9.7
|-
| 
| 5 || 0 || 2.8 || .400 || .000 ||style="background:#ffcd35;color:#6137ad;"| 1.000 || 0.4 || 0.6 || 0.0 || 0.2 || 1.2
|-
| 
| style="background:#ffcd35;color:#6137ad;"| 24 ||style="background:#ffcd35;color:#6137ad;"| 24 || 37.3 || .523 || .111 || .758 || 5.8 || 4.4 || 1.3 || 0.8 ||style="background:#ffcd35;color:#6137ad;"| 21.1
|}

Awards and records

Awards
 James Worthy, NBA Finals Most Valuable Player Award
 Magic Johnson, All-NBA First Team
 Michael Cooper, NBA All-Defensive First Team

All-Star
 Kareem Abdul-Jabbar was named to his 18th consecutive NBA All-Star Game. He broke the All-Star scoring record during the game at Chicago Stadium
 Magic Johnson was voted to his 6th consecutive NBA All-Star Game as a starter and 8th overall
 James Worthy was voted to his 3rd consecutive NBA All-Star Game
 Pat Riley was the NBA All-Star Games Western Conference coach for the 4th consecutive time and 6th overall

Transactions

Trades

Free Agents

Additions

Subtractions

References

External links
 

NBA championship seasons
Los
Los Angeles Lakers seasons
Western Conference (NBA) championship seasons
Los Angle
Los Angle